Martin Hagon (born 25 December 1961 in Hackney, England was a speedway, grasstrack and longtrack rider. His father was the Motorcycle competitor Alf Hagon.

World Longtrack Championship Record

 1985 –  Esbjerg 12pts (7th)
 1987 –  Mühldorf 19pts (4th)
 1988 – Qualifying Round
 1989 – Semi-final
 1990 – Semi-final
 1991 – Semi-final

European Grasstrack Championship

 1982 –  Damme 10pts (8th)
 1983 –  Nandlastadt 14pts (6th)
 1984 –  Eenrum 24pts (Champion)

British Masters Grasstrack Championship
 1982 –  Exeter Finalist
 1983 –  Long Marston Airfield Finalist
 1984 –  Yarm (Champion)
 1985 –  Andover Finalist
 1986 –  Exeter (2nd)
 1987 –  Andover (Champion)
 1988 –  Abingdon Finalist
 1989 –  Andover Finalist
 1990 –  Bridgnorth (2nd)
 1991 –  Tonbridge Finalist

After Racing
Martin has gone on to great success after his racing with the business his father set up 'Hagon Shocks'. Today he runs the business and supplies many of the racing fraternity.

References

External links
 https://www.methanolpress.com/tag/martin-hagon/
 https://www.hagon-shocks.co.uk/
 http://www.hagonshocksusa.com/abouthagon.htm
 http://www.lakesidehammers.co/mear-reveals-hagon-help/
 https://www.younglionsspeedway.co.uk/riders/sam-hagon/
 https://grasstrackgb.co.uk/martin-hagon/
 http://wwosbackup.proboards.com/thread/1293
 https://www.youtube.com/watch?v=5186AyH7WKI

1961 births
Living people
British speedway riders
English motorcycle racers
Hackney Hawks riders
Rye House Rockets riders
Poole Pirates riders
Sheffield Tigers riders
Ipswich Witches riders
People from the London Borough of Hackney
Individual Speedway Long Track World Championship riders